John Alec Baker  (6 August 1926 – 26 December 1987) was an English author, best known for The Peregrine, which won the Duff Cooper Prize in 1967.

The Peregrine
Robert Macfarlane deemed The Peregrine to be "a masterpiece of twentieth-century non-fiction" in his introduction to the New York Review Books edition of the book. On the back jacket cover of the same edition, James Dickey states that the book "transcends any 'nature writing' of our time," while Barry Lopez declares the book to be "one of the most beautifully written, carefully observed and evocative wildlife accounts I have ever read." Werner Herzog called it the "one book I would ask you to read if you want to make films," and said elsewhere "... it has prose of the caliber that we have not seen since Joseph Conrad."

In January 2018, The Peregrine was included by the Arts and Humanities Research Council in a list of 10 contenders   to find the UK's favourite book about nature. When the result was announced at the end of January on the BBC Winterwatch programme it did not make the top three. The poll was topped by Fingers in the Sparkle Jar by Chris Packham.
The book recounts a single year from October to April (probably of 1962/3) from the author's ten-year obsession with the peregrines that wintered near his home in Chelmsford, Essex, in eastern England. The writing is lyrically charged throughout, as the author's role of diligent observer gives way to a personal transformation, as Baker becomes, in the words of James Dickey on the book's jacket cover, "a fusion of man and bird."

Over the years, there has been much debate over the veracity of Baker's observations of the behaviour of peregrines. Conor Jameson has suggested in his book Silent Spring Revisited<ref>Silent Spring Revisited by Conor Mark Jameson, A & C Black 2012, </ref> (2012) and blog that their aberrant behaviour, as recorded by Baker, may have been as a result of the effect of chemical poisoning on their nervous system.

The BBC published a recording of The Peregrine read by David Attenborough in December 2019.  It was available for a year at the BBC Radio 4 website.

Other works and legacy
 
Baker's only other book is 1969's The Hill of Summer, a lyrical and somewhat visionary account of summer's progress across the wilder parts of southern England.  Though not as famous as The Peregrine, it enjoys much the same reputation for literary beauty and naturalist precision.

In 2011, Collins published a new edition of The Peregrine which also included The Hill of Summer and extracts from his diaries. The book includes an introduction by Mark Cocker and notes by John Fanshawe. Prior to this book, little was known about Baker's personal life but this has now changed. He was born on 6 August 1926, to engineering draughtsman Wilfred and his wife Pansy Baker, and lived in Chelmsford. His secondary education was at King Edward VI Grammar School, Chelmsford. His books are based largely on his observations of birds in the Essex countryside especially in the area from Chelmsford to the coast. He was unable to drive (despite working for The Automobile Association) and travelled by bicycle. From around 1970 he suffered from severe rheumatoid arthritis and contracted cancer as a result of the drugs taken to alleviate the arthritis. He died on 26 December 1987.

Chelmsford City Council has put a Blue Plaque at the entrance to the block of flats in Stansted Close, Chelmsford, where J A Baker lived when writing The Peregrine.  The full citation and a biography of Baker is on the Council’s website. 

The University of Essex holds items associated with Baker. These include his diaries,  drafts of his books, corrected proofs, correspondence and his optical equipment used when birdwatching. The archive was catalogued in 2016 by Hetty Saunders and is now open to all those interested in Baker's life and work.

In October 2017 Little Toller Books published the first biography of Baker, entitled My House of Sky – The life and work of J. A. Baker'' by Hetty Saunders. In addition to the biography, the book includes a selection of Baker's poetry, an article about the J. A. Baker Archive by John Fanshawe, with photographs of some of the items, and a section of photographs of Baker Country taken by local photographer, Christopher Matthews. The preface to the book is by Robert Macfarlane.

References

External links
 The life and works of J. A. Baker

English male non-fiction writers
1987 deaths
1926 births
Place of birth missing
People from Chelmsford
People educated at King Edward VI Grammar School, Chelmsford
English nature writers
20th-century English male writers